This page list topics related to French Polynesia.



0-9

A

 Acteon Group
 Administrative divisions of French Polynesia
 Ahe
 Ahe Airport
 Ahunui
 Ahurei
 Aia Api
 Air Moorea
 Air Moorea Flight 1121
 Air Tahiti
 Air Tahiti Nui
 Akamaru Island
 Akiaki
 Amanu
 Anaa
 Anaa Airport
 Angakauitai
 Anuanuraro
 Anuanurunga
 Apataki
 Apataki Airport
 Apou
 Aratika
 Arue, French Polynesia
 Arutua
 Arutua Airport
 A.S. Central Sport
 A.S. Dragon (Tahiti)
 A.S. Tefana
 Assembly of French Polynesia
 Atumata
 Atuona
 Atuona Bay
 Atuona Airport
 Aukena
 Austral Islands
 Austral language
 Avatika
 Avatoru
 Avatoru Pass

B

 Bass Islands (French Polynesia)
 Billabong Pro Teahupoo
 Billabong Pro Teahupoo 2015
 Billabong Pro Teahupoo 2016
 Bora Bora
 Bora Bora Airport
 Bora Bora Commune
 Bora Bora Island

C

 Calvary Cemetery (Atuona)
 CFP franc
 Christian Church in French Polynesia
 The Church of Jesus Christ of Latter-day Saints in French Polynesia
 Coat of arms of French Polynesia
 Communications in French Polynesia
 Conseil du Scoutisme polynésien

D

 Demographics of French Polynesia
 La Dépêche de Tahiti
 Disappointment Islands
 Duke of Gloucester Islands

E

 Economy of French Polynesia
 Eiao
 Eiao Island Nature Reserve
 Elections in French Polynesia

F

 Faaa
 Fa'a'ā International Airport
 Fa'ahia
 Faaite
 Faaite Airport
 Fakahina
 Fakarava
 Fakarava Airport
 Fakarava (commune)
 Fangatau
 Fangatau Airport
 Fangataufa
 Fatu Hiva
 Fatu Huku
 Fautaua Valley
 Fetia Api
 Flag of French Polynesia
 Flag of the Austral Islands
 Flag of the Gambier Islands
 Football in Tahiti
 Four Seasons Resort Bora Bora
 Franco-Tahitian War
 French Polynesia at the 2013 World Aquatics Championships
 French Polynesia at the 2009 World Championships in Athletics
 French Polynesia at the 2011 World Championships in Athletics
 French Polynesia at the 2013 World Championships in Athletics
 French Polynesia at the 2015 World Championships in Athletics
 French Polynesia at the 2017 World Championships in Athletics
 French Polynesia men's national junior handball team
 French Polynesia's 1st constituency
 French Polynesian Americans
 French Polynesian franc
 2004 French Polynesian legislative election
 2008 French Polynesian legislative election
 2013 French Polynesian legislative election
 1940 French Polynesian referendum
 French Polynesia men's national junior handball team
 1958 French Polynesian constitutional referendum
 2008 French Polynesian presidential election
 February 2009 French Polynesian presidential election

G

 Gaioio
 Gambier (commune)
 Gambier Islands
 Geography of French Polynesia

H

 Haapiti Rahi
 Ha'ava
 Hakahau
 Hakamaii
 Hanakee
 Hana Vave
 Hane, Marquesas Islands
 Hao (French Polynesia)
 Hao Airport
 Haraiki
 Hatutu
 Here Ai'a
 Hereheretue
 Hikueru
 Hikueru Airport
 History of the Marquesas
 Hiti
 Hitiaa O Te Ra
 Hitikau
 Hiva Oa
 Hokatu
 Honotua
 Hotel Bora Bora
 Huahine
 Huahine cuckoo-dove
 Huahine – Fare Airport

I

 Ia Ora 'O Tahiti Nui
 Îles Maria
 Îles Tuamotu-Gambier
 Independent Church of French Polynesia
 Islam in French Polynesia

J

K

 Kamaka (island)
 Katiu
 Kauehi
 Kaukura
 Kaukura Airport
 Kingdom of Bora Bora
 Kouaku

L

Leeward Islands (Society Islands)

M

 Mahina, French Polynesia
 Maiao
 Makapu
 Makaroa
 Makatea
 Makemo
 Makemo Airport
 Mangareva
 Mangareva language
 Manihi
 Manihi Airport
 Manuae (Society Islands)
 Manuhangi
 Manui
 Maohi
 Maohi Protestant Church
 Maria Est
 Marokau
 Marotiri
 Marquesan language
 Marquesan Nature Reserves
 Marquesas hotspot
 Marquesas Islands
 Marutea Nord
 Marutea Sud
 Mataiva
 Mataiva Airport
 Matureivavao
 Maupihaa
 Maupiti
 Maupiti (commune)
 Mehetia
 Mekiro
 Missionary Day
 Mohotani
 Mont Oave
 Mont Orohena
 Mo'orea
 Moorea Airport
 Moorea-Maiao
 Morane (French Polynesia)
 Moruroa
 Motane Nature Reserve
 Motu Iti (Marquesas Islands)
 Motu Nao
 Motu-O-Ari
 Motu Oa
 Motu One (Marquesas Islands)
 Motu One Reserve
 Motu One (Society Islands)
 Motu Paahi
 Motu Teiku
 Motutunga
 Mount Duff
 Mount Ronui
 Mount Tohivea
 Mouti
 Musée de Tahiti et des Îles
 Music of French Polynesia
 Music of Tahiti
 Music of the Austral Islands
 Mute Island

N

 Napuka
 Nukutavake
 Napuka Airport
 Nengonengo
 Niau
 Niau Airport
 Nihiru
 No Oe E Te Nunaa
 Notre Dame Cathedral, Papeete
 Notre Dame Cathedral, Taiohae
 Nuku Hiva
 Nukutavake
 Nukutavake Airport
 Nukutepipi

O

 O Porinetia To Tatou Ai'a
 Ome (Bora Bora)
 Order of Tahiti Nui
 Overseas departments and territories of France

P

 Paahi
 Paea
 Palliser Islands
 Pao Pao
 Papara
 Papeari
 Papeete
 Papeete Market
 Papeete Tahiti Temple
 Papenoo River
 Papuri Island
 Paraoa
 Patio (Taha'a)
 Paul Gauguin Cultural Center
 Paul Gauguin Museum (Tahiti)
 Pinaki (French Polynesia) 
 Pirae
 Pitiuu Uta
 Point Venus
 Politics of French Polynesia
 Polynesia
 Polynesian languages
 Pōmare Dynasty
 Portland Reef
 Postage stamps and postal history of French Polynesia
 President of French Polynesia
 Protestant Reformed Church in French Polynesia
 Puaumu
 Pueu
 Puka-Puka
 Puka-Puka Airport
 Pukarua
 Pukarua Airport
 Puna'auia

Q

R

 Raeffsky Islands
 Raiatea
 Raiatea Airport
 Raivavae
 Raivavae Airport
 Rangiroa
 Rangiroa Airport
 Rangiroa (commune)
 Rapa Iti
 Raraka
 Raroia
 Raroia Airport
 Ravahere
 Reao
 Reao Airport
 Reitoru
 Rekareka
 Rikitea
 Rimatara
 Rimatara Airport
 Roman Catholic Archdiocese of Papeete
 Roman Catholic Diocese of Taiohae
 Rugby union in French Polynesia
 Rumarei
 Rurutu
 Rurutu Airport

S

 St. Michael's Cathedral, Rikitea
 Stade Hamuta
 Stade Pater Te Hono Nui

T

 Ta'a Oa
 Ta'aroa
 Taenga
 Taha'a
 Tahanea
 Taha Uku
 Tahiti
 Tahiti at the 2011 Pacific Games
 Tahiti at the 2015 Pacific Games
 Tahiti at the 2011 World Aquatics Championships
 Tahiti Cup
 Tahiti International
 Tahiti Ligue 2
 Tahiti national basketball team
 Tahiti national beach soccer team
 Tahiti national football team
 Tahiti national rugby sevens team
 Tahiti national rugby union team
 Tahitipresse
 Tahiti Rugby Union
 Tahiti swiftlet
 Tahitian drumming
 Tahitian Football Federation
 Tahitian Handball League
 Tahitian language
 Tahitian pearl
 Tahitian ukulele
 Tahitians
 Tahoera'a Huiraatira
 Tahuata
 Taiarapu-Est
 Taiarapu-Ouest
 Taiaro
 Taiohae
 Tai Pī (province)
 Takapoto
 Takapoto Airport
 Takaroa
 Takaroa Airport
 Takume
 Tane (Bora Bora)
 Tapu (Bora Bora)
 Tapura Amui No Raromatai
 Tapura Amui No Te Faatereraa Manahune – Tuhaa Pae
 Tapura Huiraatira
 Taputapuatea
 Taputapuatea marae
 Tarauru Roa
 Taravai
 Tatakoto
 Tatakoto Airport
 Tauere
 Taufarii
 Tauna
 Tautira
 Tautira Bay
 Tavini Huiraatira
 Teahitia
 Teahupo'o
 Teauaone
 Teauotu
 Tekava
 Tekokota
 Telecommunications in French Polynesia
 Telephone numbers in French Polynesia
 Tematagi
 Temetiu
 Temoe
 Tenararo
 Tenarunga
 Tenoko
 Tepapuri
 Tepoto (South)
 Te Tiarama
 Teohootepohatu
 Tepoto (North)
 Tepu Nui
 Terihi
 Tetiaroa
 Teva I Uta
 Tevairoa
 Tiarama Adventist College
 Tikei
 Tikehau
 Tikehau Airport
 Tiputa Pass
 Tiripone Mama Taira Putairi
 Toau
 Tokorua
 Toopua
 To'ovi'i
 Totegegie Airport
 Transport in French Polynesia
 Tuaeu
 Tuamotuan language
 Tuanake
 Tubuai
 Tubuai – Mataura Airport
 Tumaraa
 Tūpai
 Tupe (Bora Bora)
 Tureia
 Tureia Airport
 Two Groups Islands

U

 Ua Huka
 Ua Pou
 University of French Polynesia
 Uturoa

V

 Vahanga
 Vahitahi
 Vahitahi Airport
 Vaiatekeue
 Vaipae'e
 Vaipō Waterfall
 Vairaatea
 Vairao
 Vaitahu
 Vaitape
 Vaitepiha River
 Vaituha
 Vananui
 Vanavana
 Vanilla production in French Polynesia

W

 Wan Air
 Windward Islands (Society Islands)

X

Y

Z

Lists related to French Polynesia
 List of airlines of French Polynesia
 List of football clubs in French Polynesia
 List of mammals of French Polynesia
 List of monarchs of Bora Bora
 List of monarchs of Huahine
 List of monarchs of Mangareva
 List of monarchs of Raiatea
 List of monarchs of Tahiti
 List of volcanoes in French Polynesia

See also
 List of cities in French Polynesia
 Lists of country-related topics
 List of international rankings
 Outline of French Polynesia
 Topic outline of geography

French Polynesia-related lists
French Polynesia